John Braham may refer to:
John Braham (MP) (1417), MP for Suffolk
John Braham (tenor) (1774–1856), English opera singer
John Joseph Braham, Sr. (1847–1919), Anglo-American composer and conductor
John Braham (RAF officer) (1920–1974), British fighter pilot

See also
John Abraham (disambiguation)